Industry is a borough in Beaver County, Pennsylvania, along the Ohio River. As of the 2020 census, the population was 1,833. It is part of the Pittsburgh metropolitan area.

History 
The borough was organized as the Township of Industry in 1856 from an electoral district named Industry that comprised portions of Ohio Township and Brighton Township. The township incorporated as a borough in 1960. 

The village of Industry was a settlement in the township laid out in 1836 by William McCallister, though a post office had been established in 1833. The name was selected to promote the town's industry.

Geography
Industry is located at  (40.656017, -80.409538).

Pennsylvania Route 68 (Midland Beaver Road) is the main road through the borough, leading west into Midland and east to Beaver.

The community of Merrill was located in the southeastern part of the borough, along the Ohio River. No one has lived in Merrill since the 1960s at the latest (probably much earlier).

Recreation
A small portion of Pennsylvania State Game Lands Number 173 is located in Industry.

Surrounding and adjacent neighborhoods
Industry has four land borders with Brighton Township to the north, Vanport Township in the far northeast corner, Midland to the southwest, and Ohioville to the northwest.  Across the Ohio River to the south, Industry runs adjacent with (from west to east) Shippingport, Raccoon Township and Potter Township.

Demographics

As of the census of 2000, there were 1,921 people, 772 households, and 581 families residing in the borough. The population density was 195.2 people per square mile (75.4/km²). There were 816 housing units at an average density of 82.9 per square mile (32.0/km²). The racial makeup of the borough was 96.88% White, 1.93% African American, 0.05% Native American, 0.16% Asian, 0.57% from other races, and 0.42% from two or more races. 1.41% of the population were Hispanic or Latino of any race.

There were 772 households, out of which 28.9% had children under the age of 18 living with them, 60.0% were married couples living together, 9.5% had a female householder with no husband present, and 24.7% were non-families. 22.0% of all households were made up of individuals, and 11.0% had someone living alone who was 65 years of age or older. The average household size was 2.47 and the average family size was 2.85.

In the borough the population was spread out, with 21.3% under the age of 18, 6.9% from 18 to 24, 26.1% from 25 to 44, 27.7% from 45 to 64, and 18.0% who were 65 years of age or older. The median age was 43 years. For every 100 females, there were 98.7 males. For every 100 females age 18 and over, there were 94.2 males.

The median income for a household in the borough was $38,125, and the median income for a family was $43,571. Males had a median income of $34,667 versus $22,731 for females. The per capita income for the borough was $18,337. 8.1% of the population and 6.9% of families were below the poverty line. Out of the total population, 14.0% of those under the age of 18 and none of those 65 and older were living below the poverty line.

Education
Industry is home to the Western Beaver County School District main campus, including the Western Beaver Junior/Senior High School.

See also
 List of cities and towns on the Ohio River

References

Pennsylvania populated places on the Ohio River
Populated places established in 1836
Pittsburgh metropolitan area
Boroughs in Beaver County, Pennsylvania
1960 establishments in Pennsylvania